State Highway 52 (abbreviated SH-52) is two once-connected highways in the U.S. state of Oklahoma. There are no lettered spur routes from either of them.

Route description

Southern section
The southern SH-52 is a short,  state highway in McIntosh County, Oklahoma. It connects State Highway 9 to the town of Hanna.

Northern section
Along the way it intersects US-62 near Morris.

History
At one time, at least as recently as 1972, the two sections of SH-52 were connected by a dirt section running from SH-9 to US-266. This section has since been decommissioned.

Junction list

Southern section

Northern section

References

052
Transportation in McIntosh County, Oklahoma
Transportation in Okmulgee County, Oklahoma